The  is a Japanese 2-8-4 Berkshire wheel arrangement steam locomotive type created by rebuilding an earlier class to suit postwar requirements. 78 of the 380 successful, powerful prewar Class D50 2-8-2 Mikado locomotives were rebuilt and redesigned as D60s between 1951 and 1956 by Hideo Shima at the JNR Hamamatsu (Nagoya) Region, Nagano, (Nagoya) Region, and Tsuchizaki, (Sendai) Region workshops. As with the rebuilding of Class D51 to Class D61 and Class D52 to Class D62 locomotives, an additional trailing axle was included to reduce the heavy axle load of the D50 and allow more widespread use. The cylinder diameter was reduced from 570 mm on the D50s to 550 mm to minimize wheel spin, and they were built to replace the older Class 9600s in 1951. The D60s have a top speed of 80 km/h (50 mph).

The spread of electrification and increasing numbers of diesel locomotives resulted in the first D60s being withdrawn from 1966. A few examples based at Wakamatsu Depot soldiered on, hauling coal trains on the Chikuhō Mainline in northern Kyushu, and the last member of the class (D60 61) was finally withdrawn in August 1974. Four have been preserved while the remainder were scrapped.

Specifications

Locomotive Build details

Preserved examples
 D60 1 (Formerly D50 162 originally built in 1927) In grounds of Yamaguchi Prefectural Museum
 D60 27 (Formerly D50 237 originally built in 1928) Park in Tachibana Fukuoka Prefecture,  (in poor condition)
 D60 46 (Formerly D50 157 originally built in 1927) Park in Iizuka Fukuoka, Prefecture
 D60 61 (Formerly D50 282 originally built in 1928) Park in Ashiya Fukuoka, Prefecture

See also
 Japan Railways locomotive numbering and classification

Steam locomotives of Japan
2-8-4 locomotives
1067 mm gauge locomotives of Japan
Preserved steam locomotives of Japan
Railway locomotives introduced in 1951
1′D2′ h2 locomotives
Rebuilt locomotives 
Freight locomotives